Shepreth railway station serves the village of Shepreth in Cambridgeshire, England.

History

It was opened in 1851 by the Royston and Hitchin Railway as the northern terminus of an extension of the original route from Royston, after earlier plans by the Eastern Counties Railway to build a Cambridge to Bedford line through the village fell through due to lack of finance.  The ECR did complete the line north through to a junction with its main line from London to Cambridge in 1852 and initially ran services on the R&HR, but they later gave way to the Great Northern Railway when its lease of the Royston company expired in 1866.  The GNR then began running through trains between Kings Cross & Cambridge over the line from 1 April that year, having gained full running powers over ECR metals and access to Cambridge station as part of an agreement ratified by parliament two years previously.

Goods traffic was handled at the station until 1965.  From 1978, through trains to the capital temporarily ceased when electric operation was inaugurated to Royston as part of the Kings Cross Outer Suburban electrification scheme.  Passengers then had to use a Cambridge to Royston DMU shuttle and change at the latter station for London.  Government approval for extending the wires through to Cambridge was eventually granted in 1987  (as a 'fill-in' scheme to link wired routes either side) and the work was completed 12 months later, allowing through running to Kings Cross to resume.

Platform 2 (for trains to Cambridge) was extended in Summer 2017 to be able to accommodate 8-car trains (including Class 700 units), without straddling the level crossing. Although platform 1 was not lengthened, 8-car trains now call there using Selective door operation which opens the doors on the front four carriages only. Shepreth will be connected to the Thameslink network via the canal tunnels at Kings Cross St Pancras from 2018.

Services 

All services at Shepreth are operated by Thameslink using  EMUs.

The typical off-peak service in trains per hour is:
 2 tph to 

On weekends, the service is reduced to hourly in each direction.

References

External links 

Railway stations in Cambridgeshire
DfT Category F2 stations
Former Great Northern Railway stations
Railway stations served by Govia Thameslink Railway
Railway stations in Great Britain opened in 1851
railway station